Ocean Drive is a major thoroughfare in the South Beach neighborhood of Miami Beach, Florida.

Route description
The road starts at South Pointe just south of 1st Street, near the southernmost end of the main barrier island of Miami Beach, about a quarter mile west of the Atlantic Ocean. Ocean Drive continues north to 15th Street, immediately southeast of Lincoln Road.

Attractions
Ocean Drive is known mostly for its Art Deco hotels and restaurants/bars, many of which have been prominently featured in numerous movies and media.  Among the most popular is the 1939 Colony Hotel, known as the most photographed art deco hotel. Renovated as a boutique hotel, it has been featured in cameos in scores of movies and TV shows, including the series Dexter. Another popular art deco hotel is the Clevelander Hotel; in addition to its standard hotel services, it has an indoor sports lounge, a dance floor and pool area on the ground floor, and a complementary roof-top lounge. The exterior of the Carlyle Hotel was used for the Birdcage drag club in the 1996 comedy The Birdcage. 

The Sunray Apartments were featured in the movie Scarface (1983). The 2002 video game, Grand Theft Auto: Vice City, based the look of its eponymous city on Miami. It has a replica of Ocean Drive with exactly the same name.

Ocean Drive is also the location of the famed Casa Casuarina, the residence of the late Italian fashion designer Gianni Versace. Since his death, the house was sold and adapted for use as a boutique hotel. It is one of the most photographed houses in North America.

Culture
Developed in the 1920s and 1930s, the street is the center of the Miami Art Deco District, which contains about 900 preserved, contributing buildings. It is listed on the National Register of Historic Places. Streamline Moderne evolved from the Art Deco style, and dominates the street. 

Ocean Drive magazine is named after the street. British easy-listening duo The Lighthouse Family released a single entitled "Ocean Drive” (although this is based on a road in the UK), which reached #11 on the UK Singles Chart. A street in the 2002 video game Grand Theft Auto: Vice City is based on the street.

Restaurants and cabaret 
One of the most famous restaurants on this strip is Mango's Tropical Café, a Caribbean-inspired restaurant that also has live performances by dancers and singers. 

Known for its cabaret and drag queen shows, the Palace Bar is dedicated to the LGBTQ community.

Cars
In July 2020, Miami Beach Commission passed a resolution that banned cars on Ocean Drive in light of the COVID-19 pandemic to create a pedestrian thoroughfare and increased sidewalk seating. 
Ocean Drive reopened to traffic in January 2022.

Gallery

References

Florida, DK Eyewitness Travel Guides, 2004, pgs. 58 & 59

External links
Google historical timeline of Ocean Drive, South Beach, Miami

Roads in Miami Beach, Florida
Roads in Miami-Dade County, Florida
Shopping districts and streets in the United States
Tourist attractions in Miami-Dade County, Florida